Vainu may refer to several places in Estonia:

Vainu, Ida-Viru County, village in Sonda Parish, Ida-Viru County
Vainu, Pärnu County, village in Sauga Parish, Pärnu County